The enzyme S-carboxymethylcysteine synthase (EC 4.5.1.5) catalyzes the reaction 

3-chloro-L-alanine + thioglycolate  S-carboxymethyl-L-cysteine + chloride

This enzyme belongs to the family of lyases, specifically the class of carbon-halide lyases.  The systematic name of this enzyme class is 3-chloro-L-alanine chloride-lyase (adding thioglycolate; S-carboxymethyl-L-cysteine-forming). This enzyme is also called S-carboxymethyl-L-cysteine synthase.  It employs one cofactor, pyridoxal phosphate.

References

 

EC 4.5.1
Pyridoxal phosphate enzymes
Enzymes of unknown structure